Independence Run is a tributary of the Susquehanna River in Snyder County, Pennsylvania, in the United States. It is one of the major streams in Chapman Township. Its drainage basin is designated as a Warmwater Fishery and a Migaratory Fishery.

Course
Independence Run begins in a valley in Chapman Township. It flows northeast for a few hundred feet before turning east-northeast for over a mile. The stream then turns east-southeast for several tenths of a mile, receiving one unnamed tributary from the left and one from the right. In this reach, it begins flowing near the border of the census-designated place of Port Trevorton. The stream eventually turns south-southeast for more than a mile, receiving an unnamed tributary from the right and entering Port Trevorton, where it immediately receives another unnamed tributary from the right. It continues flowing in the same direction for a few tenths of a mile until it crosses US Route 11/US Route 15. A short distance further downstream, the stream reaches its confluence with the Susquehanna River.

Independence Run joins the Susquehanna River  upriver of its mouth.

Geography and geology

A road runs parallel to Independence Run for much of its length.

Watershed and biology
The stream is entirely within the United States Geological Survey quadrangle of Dalmatia. Its mouth is located within  of Chapman and is also near the community of Independence.

Independence Run is one of the major streams in Chapman Township, along with Chapman Creek and West Branch Mahantango Creek. Many of the streams in the township have a tendency to flow through open agricultural areas, allowing sediments and chemicals to reach the stream. However, planting trees along streambanks to create a riparian buffer would improve this, as well as connect forest habitats.

The drainage basin of Independence Run is designated as a Warmwater Fishery and a Migratory Fishery. This regulation forbade any attempt to target or catch bass between May 1 and June 17, with immediate catch and release being in effect for bass the rest of the year.

History
Independence Run was entered into the Geographic Names Information System on August 2, 1979. Its identifier in the Geographic Names Information System is 1177726.

See also
Dalmatia Creek, next tributary of the Susquehanna River going downriver
Chapman Creek, next tributary of the Susquehanna River going upriver
List of rivers of Pennsylvania

References

Rivers of Snyder County, Pennsylvania
Tributaries of the Susquehanna River
Rivers of Pennsylvania